David Leitch (born November 16, 1975) is an American filmmaker, actor, stunt performer and stunt coordinator who made his directorial debut on the 2014 action film John Wick with Chad Stahelski, though only Stahelski was credited. Leitch then directed the 2017 thriller film Atomic Blonde, starring Charlize Theron, and 2018's Deadpool 2, the sequel to the 2016 film. In 2019, he directed Hobbs & Shaw, a spin-off of the Fast & Furious franchise, and in 2022 directed Bullet Train, starring Brad Pitt.

Career
Leitch was a stunt double for Brad Pitt five times and two times for Jean-Claude Van Damme. Leitch and his crew won two awards for The Bourne Ultimatum at the Screen Actors Guild Awards. He also shared a 2008 Taurus World Stunt Award with fellow stunt-person Kai Martin for high work.

He wrote and starred in Confessions of an Action Star, a parody of action films and the action film industry released in 2009.

Leitch and Chad Stahelski opened an action design production company called 87Eleven in 1997. In 2009, Stahelski and Leitch were second-unit directors and stunt co-ordinators on Ninja Assassin. The two co-directed the 2014 film John Wick, although Leitch himself was not credited as co-director. Leitch executive produced the two John Wick sequels, which Stahelski solo directed.

He moved on to direct films such as Atomic Blonde, Deadpool 2 and Fast & Furious Presents: Hobbs & Shaw with his wife and creative partner Kelly McCormick serving as a producer. In 2022, he also directed Brad Pitt in the action-thriller Bullet Train.

Upcoming projects

In January 2019, Leitch signed on to direct Undying Love, based on the limited comic book series by Tomm Coker and Daniel Freedman, for Studio 8. In September 2020, Leitch signed on to direct and produce stuntman drama The Fall Guy for Universal Pictures, with Drew Pearce writing the screenplay and Ryan Gosling and Emily Blunt starring; the film, based on the 1980s television series of the same name, is scheduled for release on March 1, 2024. In November 2022, Leitch became attached to direct spy thriller Red Shirt, based on a pitch by Simon Kinberg and with Channing Tatum set to star; by the end of the month, the project was picked up by Amazon Studios.

Leitch was set to direct action thriller Fast & Loose for Netflix and STXfilms, with Will Smith set to star, but by March 2022, he left the project to focus instead on The Fall Guy.

Filmography

Film

Writer
 Confessions of an Action Star (2005)

Producer
 Nobody (2021)
 Violent Night (2022)

Executive producer
 John Wick: Chapter 2 (2017)
 John Wick: Chapter 3 – Parabellum (2019)
 Kate (2021)
 John Wick: Chapter 4 (2023)

Short film

Second-unit director

 In Hell (2003) 
 The Midnight Meat Train (2008)
 Ninja Assassin (2009)
 The King of Fighters (2010)
 The Mechanic (2011)
 Conan the Barbarian (2011)
 In Time (2011)
 Hansel & Gretel: Witch Hunters (2013)
 Parker (2013)
 Anchorman 2: The Legend Continues (2013)
 The Wolverine (2013)
 Escape Plan (2013)
 Teenage Mutant Ninja Turtles (2014)
 Hitman: Agent 47 (2015)
 Jurassic World (2015)
 Captain America: Civil War (2016)
 Teenage Mutant Ninja Turtles: Out of the Shadows (2016)

Stuntwork

Acting credits

Television

Stunts

Acting credits

Video games

Awards and nominations

References

External links
 
 David Leitch interviewed at Kung Fu Cinema
 David Leitch as Hollywood.com
 David Leitch at TV Guild
 David Leitch as Fandango
 David Leitch at Variety.com

Living people
1975 births
Place of birth missing (living people)
American male film actors
American film directors
American stunt performers
American male television actors
American parodists
Comedy film directors
Parody film directors
Action film directors
21st-century American male actors
People from Kohler, Wisconsin
Film producers from Wisconsin